The Institute of Museum and Library Services (IMLS) is an independent agency of the United States federal government established in 1996.  It is the main source of federal support for libraries and museums within the United States, having the mission to "create strong libraries and museums that connect people with information and ideas." In fiscal year 2015, IMLS had a budget of $228 million. It is a sub-agency of the National Foundation on the Arts and the Humanities, along with the National Endowment for the Arts, the National Endowment for the Humanities, and the Federal Council on the Arts and the Humanities.

In addition to its other responsibilities, the IMLS annually awards the National Medal for Museum and Library Service, given for community service by libraries and museums.

IMLS is located at 955 L'Enfant Plaza North, SW, Suite 4000, Washington, D.C.  20024-2135.

History and Purpose
IMLS was established by the Museum and Library Services Act (MLSA) on September 30, 1996, which includes the Library Services and Technology Act and the Museum Services Act.  It consolidated the activities of the National Commission on Libraries and Information Science. The MLSA was reauthorized in 2003 and again in 2010. The law combined the Institute of Museum Services, which had been in existence since 1976 as part of the National Foundation on the Arts and the Humanities, and the Library Programs Office of the Office of Educational Research and Improvement   which had been part of the Department of Education since 1956.  Lawmakers at that time saw "great potential in an Institute that is focused on the combined roles that libraries and museums play in our community life." The National Museum and Library Services Board, established by 20 U.S.C. § 9105a, advises the agency on general policies with respect to the duties, powers, and authority of IMLS relating to museum, library, and information services. 
As amended, MLSA authorizes IMLS to promote improvements in library services; to facilitate access to resources in libraries; to encourage resource sharing among libraries; to support museums in fulfilling their public service and educational roles; to encourage leadership and innovation to enhance museum services; to assist museums in the conservation of America's heritage; to support museums in achieving the highest standards of management and service to the public; and to support resource sharing among museums, libraries and other organizations. MLSA also authorizes IMLS to carry out and publish analyses of the impact of museum and library services.

The act comes up for reauthorization every 5 years. Adjustment to the act have been made over time.

In April 2014, Representative Paul Ryan (R-WI) recommended that the federal government not fund MLSA and "shift the federal agency’s responsibilities to the private sector in his 2015 fiscal year budget resolution" such as "funded at the state and local level and augmented significantly by charitable contributions from the private sector".

Consolidation
Following a proposal by President George W. Bush, the activities of the National Commission on Libraries and Information Science was consolidated under IMLS, along with some of the activities of the National Center for Education Statistics, in order to create a unified body for federal support of library and information policy.  The consolidation took effect in early 2008.

Leadership 
When Congress passed the Library Services and Technology Act in 1996, it moved library responsibilities out of the Department of Education and created the IMLS as new agency. The act stipulated that the agency maintain a rotating directorship starting with the former director of the Institute of Museum Services for a four-year term. In the fifth year, the directorship would pass to a representative from the field of library and information science.

Directors of the Institute of Museum and Library Services 

Diane Frankel (1996): prior to leading the agency through its transition to include federal library as well as museum programs, Frankel served as director of the Institute of Museum Services.

Robert S. Martin (2001): preceding his position at IMLS, Martin was a professor and interim director of the School of Library and Information Studies at Texas Woman's University. He also served as Director and Librarian of the Texas State Library and Archives Commission.  He articulated the convergence of new media in lifelong learning at the beginning of the millennium at the 21st Century Learners Conference in November, 2001. 

Anne-Imelda Radice (2006): she previously served as chief of staff for the U.S. Department of Education and as curator in the Office of the Architect of the Capitol. She earned a bachelor's degree from Wheaton College in Norton, Massachusetts; a master's degree from Villa Schifanoia Graduate School of Fine Arts in Florence, Italy; a second master’s from American University in Washington, D.C.; and a Ph.D. from the University of North Carolina at Chapel Hill.

Susan H. Hildreth (2011): she began her career as a branch librarian at the Edison Township Library in New Jersey, where she was president of the Public Library Association. She has also been the city librarian in Seattle and state librarian of California. In addition, Hildreth was deputy director of San Francisco Public Library.

Dr. Kathryn K. Matthew (2015): a scientist with a 30-year museum career, Matthew’s experience includes curation, collections management, and research roles at the Academy of Natural Sciences in Philadelphia and Cranbrook Institute of Science. Her experience includes fundraising and marketing roles at the Santa Barbara Museum of Natural History, the Virginia Museum of Natural History, The Nature Conservancy, the Historic Charleston Foundation, and The Children’s Museum of Indianapolis. She was also executive director of the New Mexico Museum of Natural History and Science.

Crosby Kemper III (2020): previous director of the Kansas City Public Library, from 2005 until his confirmation as IMLS Director.

Strategic Plan
The Institute of Museums and Library Services Strategic Plan for 2022-2025 has four major components: 1) Champion Lifelong Learning; 2) Strengthen Community Engagement; 3) Advance Collections Stewardship and Advancement and 4) Demonstrate Excellence in Public Service.

Grants
The Institute of Museum and Library Services offers numerous grants for museums, libraries, and other cultural heritage institutions.  The grants support the IMLS's strategic goals of advancing "innovation, lifelong learning, and cultural and civic engagement."

Research
The Office of Impact Assessment and Learning (OIAL) "supports the agency in its efforts to create strong libraries and museums that connect people to information and ideas."  OIAL performs three key functions: policy research, evaluations, and survey and data collection.

Survey and data collection
Data Catalog – Data relating to grants administration and data about libraries, museums, and related organizations.
Public Library Survey (PLS) – collects data from 9,000 public library systems and 17,000 public library outlets.
State Library Agency Survey (SLAA) – provides descriptive data about state libraries.
Public Needs for Library and Museum Services Survey (PNLMS) – measures "expectations and satisfaction" with cultural heritage institutions through a household survey.
Museum Universe Data File (MUDF) – contains information about cultural heritage institutions in the United States.
Administration Discretionary Grant Data – Records of grants funded by IMLS since FY 1996.

Public Meetings

Agendas and published minutes:
 Agenda for the 44th Meeting of the NMLS Board, 10 December 2021

References

External links 

 FederalRegister.gov &mdash; Institute of Museum and Library Services

Library-related organizations
Library-related professional associations
Museums in the United States
Museum-related professional associations
Government agencies established in 1996
Independent agencies of the United States government
1996 establishments in the United States
National Foundation on the Arts and the Humanities